Puthiya Theerpu is a 1985 Tamil-language action drama film, starring Vijayakanth and Ambika. The film was directed by C. V. Rajendran, and was produced by Chitra Lakshmanan and Chitra Raamu. The Director of Photography was done by V. Prabhakar. The editing work was done by N. Chandra. Ilaiyaraja was the music director of the film. The film was released on 4 October 1985. The film was a remake of Telugu film Neti Bharatham.

Cast
 Vijayakanth as Inspector Raja
 Ambika as Radha
 M.N. Nambiar
 Cho Ramaswamy
 Janagaraj
 Srikanth
 V. Gopalakrishnan
 Rajasekhar
 Chitra Lakshmanan
 Rajyalakshmi
 Ganthimathi

Soundtrack
Soundtrack was composed by Ilaiyaraaja.

References

1985 films
Films scored by Ilaiyaraaja
Indian action drama films
Films about social issues in India
Tamil remakes of Telugu films